This is a historical list of all Roman Catholic bishops whose sees were on the island of Puerto Rico, with links to the bishops who consecrated them. It includes only members of the Puerto Rican Episcopal Conference and their predecessors. From its establishment in 1531 until the erection of the diocese of Ponce in 1924, the entire island was a single diocese. In 1960, the diocese of San Juan was raised to an archdiocese, and is currently the suffragan see of the five other dioceses on the island: Ponce, Arecibo, Caguas, Mayagüez, and Fajardo–Humacao.

The number references the sequence of consecration.  "Diocese" refers to the diocese over which the bishop presided or, if he did not preside, the diocese in which he served as coadjutor bishop or auxiliary bishop. The Roman numeral before the diocese name represents where in the sequence that bishop falls; e.g., the fourth bishop of Arecibo is written "IV Arecibo." Where a diocese is in bold type it indicates that the bishop is the current bishop of that diocese. Titular sees are not listed. Under consecrators are the numbers (or letters) referencing previous bishops on the list. The number listed first represents the principal consecrator. If a series of letters is under "Consecrators," then the consecrators were bishops from outside Puerto Rico (the list of foreign sees is at the bottom of the page).

Chart of episcopal succession

Abbreviations and notes

Foreign consecrators

 AA=Archbishop of Seville
 AB=Archbishop of Zaragoza
 AC=Bishop of Segorbe-Albarracín
 AD=Bishop of Zamora in Spain
 AE=Bishop of Popayán
 AF=Archbishop of Santo Domingo
 AG=Bishop of Barcelona
 AH=Bishop of Caracas
 AI=Archbishop of Embrun
 AJ=Titular Bishop of Temnos
 AK=Titular Bishop of Troas
 AL=Titular Archbishop of Corinth
 AM=Bishop of Puebla de los Angeles
 AN=Bishop of Orvieto
 AO=Patriarch of the West Indies
 AP=Archbishop of Santafé en Nueva Granada
 AQ=Titular Bishop of Lycopolis
 AR=Bishop of Pamplona
 AS=Titular Bishop of Lares
 AT=Titular Bishop of Isauropolis
 AU=Titular Archbishop of Pharsalus
 AV=Bishop of Coria
 AW=Bishop of Palencia
 AX=Bishop of Jaén
 AY=Bishop of Astorga
 AZ=Bishop of Albarracín
 BA=Archbishop of Toledo
 BB=Bishop of Orihuela
 BC=Titular Bishop of Carystus
 BD=Titular Bishop of Loryma
 BE=Archbishop of Lima
 BF=Bishop of Córdoba
 BG=Bishop of Tui
 BH=Bishop of Canarias
 BI=Archbishop of Tarragona
 BJ=Bishop of Girona
 BK=Titular Archbishop of Lyana
 BL=Bishop of Teruel and Albarracín
 BM=Bishop of Lugo
 BN=Archbishop of Valladolid
 BO=Titular Bishop of Arca in Phoenicia
 BP=Titular Archbishop of Damascus
 BQ=Bishop of Huesca
 BR=Archbishop of New Orleans
 BS=Titular Bishop of Curium
 BT=Titular Bishop of Sidyma
 BU=Titular Archbishop of Sardes
 BV=Bishop of San Cristóbal de la Habana
 BW=Bishop of Cienfuegos
 BX=Titular Archbishop of Philippi
 BY=Titular Archbishop of Apamea in Syria
 BZ=Titular Archbishop of Colossae
 CA=Archbishop of Philadelphia
 CB=Bishop of Wheeling
 CC=Titular Bishop of Thapsus
 CD=Bishop of Brooklyn
 CE=Bishop of Erie
 CF=Titular Bishop of Camuliana
 CG=Bishop of Tucson
 CH=Titular Bishop of Sila
 CI=Titular Bishop of Sanavus
 CJ=Titular Bishop of Anaea
 CK=Titular Bishop of Calynda
 CL=Archbishop of New York
 CM=Bishop of Saint Thomas
 CN=Bishop of Covington
 CO=Titular Archbishop of Claudiopolis in Isauria
 CP=Bishop of Fort Wayne–South Bend
 CQ=Archbishop of Washington
 CR=Titular Bishop of Murthlacum
 CS=Titular Bishop of Walla Walla
 CT=Archbishop of Boston
 CU=Titular Archbishop of Forum Novum
 CV=Titular Archbishop of Tharros
 CW=Titular Archbishop of Gradisca
 CX=Titular Archbishop of Amiternum
 CY=Titular Archbishop of Slebte
 CZ=Titular Archbishop of Mathara in Numidia

Other abbreviations
 PP=Pope

Notes

Sources

See also
 Historical list of the Catholic bishops of the United States
 List of Catholic bishops of the United States

References

Puerto Rico